The Pact for Italy was a centrist political and electoral alliance in Italy launched by Mario Segni and Mino Martinazzoli in 1994.

History
The alliance was composed of the Italian People's Party (PPI), the main successor party to Christian Democracy, the Segni Pact, the Liberal Democratic Union of Valerio Zanone and remnants of the Italian Republican Party (PRI), alongside a certain number of independent politicians coming from the Italian Socialist Party and the Italian Democratic Socialist Party.

Originally Lega Nord was to also join the alliance, but Lega Nord leader Umberto Bossi decided to join Silvio Berlusconi's Pole of Freedoms instead.

The alliance finished third place in the 1994 general election, behind the centre-right Pole of Freedoms/Pole of Good Government and the left-wing Alliance of Progressives. The alliance returned 33 seats in the Chamber of Deputies.

After the election, the alliance was disbanded. The PPI suffered a split of those who wanted to join Berlusconi's centre-right coalition (breaking from the PPI and forming the United Christian Democrats of Rocco Buttiglione) and those who wanted to ally with the left-wing Democratic Party of the Left (PDS). The remaining PPI joined the PDS in the centre-left coalition The Olive Tree led by Romano Prodi. Segni Pact become a minor force and formed the Pact of Democrats joint electoral list with Italian Renewal and the Italian Socialists for the 1996 general election in support of The Olive Tree. The Italian Republican Party and the Liberal Democratic Union joined the list Populars for Prodi, also in support for The Olive Tree.

Composition
It was composed of the following political parties:

The Pact was also joined by a number of former members of the Italian Socialist Party (PSI) and the Italian Democratic Socialist Party (PSDI), now running as independents, such as Giuliano Amato and Giulio Tremonti.

Electoral results

References

Political parties established in 1994
Defunct political party alliances in Italy
1994 establishments in Italy